Luis Diego López Breijo (born 22 August 1974) is a Uruguayan former footballer who played as a defender and manager. 

His career was intimately connected with Cagliari in Italy, for which he appeared in over 300 competitive games in 12 years. Internationally, he represented Uruguay in two Copa América tournaments.

López served as Cagliari's manager in two spells, as well as three other Serie A clubs. In 2018, he won the Uruguayan Primera División for Peñarol.

Playing career

Club
Born in Montevideo, López started playing professionally with local Club Atlético River Plate. Two years later he signed with Racing de Santander in Spain, playing 39 La Liga games in his debut season but receiving nine yellow cards and three red in the process; in Cantabria, he shared teams with compatriots Fernando Correa and José Zalazar.

López moved to Italy in 1998 and joined Cagliari Calcio, recently promoted to Serie A. During his first seven seasons in Sardinia, with the exception of his first year – only one match – he never made less than 26 league appearances and spent four years (2000–04) in the second division, also being eventually awarded team captaincy.

On 14 April 2009, following a tunnel brawl with ACF Fiorentina's Felipe Melo in a 1–2 away loss, both López and the Brazilian received a five-match ban. In July, one month shy of his 35th birthday, he signed a one-year contract with Cagliari. In the 2009–10 campaign the veteran contributed 18 games as his team again managed to avoid relegation, after finishing in 16th position.

On 9 September 2010, after not being called up to Cagliari's 2010–11 pre-season camp, López announced his retirement from professional football, having appeared in 344 official matches for his main club.

International
López made his debut for Uruguay on 19 October 1994, in a friendly match with Peru in the Estadio Nacional José Díaz in Lima (1–0 win). The following year he represented the nation at the Copa América, with the tournament being held on home soil and won by the hosts, who conceded just four goals in six matches.

López was overlooked, however, for the squads which appeared at the 2002 and 2010 FIFA World Cups, and earned a total of 32 caps.

Coaching career
In July 2012, López was named at the helm of the Primavera under-19 side of Cagliari and, on 2 October, was unveiled as new assistant coach for the main squad after the Ivo Pulga-led club parted ways with Massimo Ficcadenti. López and Pulga swapped roles in July 2013 after the former was admitted to the yearly UEFA Pro Licence course, thus being allowed to serve as head coach in the Italian top flight; he was dismissed on 6 April 2014 by owner Massimo Cellino, this being the 36th manager change he went through in 22 years of tenure.

On 1 July 2014, López was appointed at Bologna F.C. 1909 in the Italian second tier. After a good start to the season, he was relieved of his duties on 4 May 2015 following a negative streak.

López was named U.S. Città di Palermo's fourth manager of the campaign, on 26 January 2017. He was sacked on 11 April, after a run of bad results.

On 18 October 2017, López returned to Cagliari as head coach after the dismissal of Massimo Rastelli. At the end of the season, having avoided the drop, he left by mutual consent.

López returned to his homeland in early June 2018, joining Peñarol. Starting from five points behind arch-rivals Club Nacional de Football, he led the club to a league title by beating that adversary 1–0 in the final; after losing by the same margin to Nacional in the next edition, he announced his exit in December 2019.

On 5 February 2020, López returned to the Italian top division, signing with second-from-bottom Brescia Calcio following Eugenio Corini's sacking. His contract with the club – also owned by Cellino – was terminated by mutual consent on 12 August following relegation, and Luigi Delneri succeeded him. On 6 October, however, he returned to the Stadio Mario Rigamonti. He was shown the door again on 7 December, after a run of three defeats.

Personal life
He has three sons called Thiago, Ian and Inty. They were born in Italy and have been with the Cagliari youth team. The oldest son, Thiago, also played for Peñarol.

Managerial statistics

Honours

Player
Uruguay
Copa América: 1995; Runner-up 1999

Manager
Peñarol
Uruguayan Primera División: 2018

Notes

References

External links

1974 births
Living people
Footballers from Montevideo
Uruguayan footballers
Association football defenders
Uruguayan Primera División players
Club Atlético River Plate (Montevideo) players
La Liga players
Racing de Santander players
Serie A players
Serie B players
Cagliari Calcio players
Uruguay under-20 international footballers
Uruguay international footballers
1995 Copa América players
1999 Copa América players
1997 FIFA Confederations Cup players
Copa América-winning players
Uruguayan expatriate footballers
Expatriate footballers in Spain
Expatriate footballers in Italy
Uruguayan expatriate sportspeople in Spain
Uruguayan expatriate sportspeople in Italy
Uruguayan football managers
Serie A managers
Serie B managers
Cagliari Calcio managers
Bologna F.C. 1909 managers
Palermo F.C. managers
Brescia Calcio managers
Uruguayan Primera División managers
Peñarol managers
Chilean Primera División managers
Universidad de Chile managers
Uruguayan expatriate football managers
Expatriate football managers in Italy
Expatriate football managers in Chile
Uruguayan expatriate sportspeople in Chile